Jennifer Hudson is an American actress, singer and talk show host who has received various awards and nominations, including an Academy Award, a British Academy Film Award, a Critics' Choice Movie Award, a Daytime Emmy Award, a Golden Globe Award, two Grammy Awards, a Tony Award, nine NAACP Image Awards, and a Screen Actors Guild Award.

Acting

Academy Awards
The Academy Awards, now known officially as the Oscars, is a set of twenty-four awards for artistic and technical merit in the American film industry, given annually by the Academy of Motion Picture Arts and Sciences (AMPAS), to recognize excellence in cinematic achievements as assessed by the Academy's voting membership.

Black Reel Awards
The Black Reel Awards, or "BRAs", is an annual American awards ceremony hosted by the Foundation for the Augmentation of African-Americans in Film (FAAAF) to recognize excellence in African-American, as well as those of African diaspora's cinematic achievements in the around the world film industry as assessed by the Academy's voting membership.

British Academy Film Awards
The British Academy Film Awards are presented in an annual award show hosted by the British Academy of Film and Television Arts (BAFTA) to honour the best British and international contributions to film.

Critics' Choice Movie Awards
The Critics' Choice Movie Awards (formerly known as the Broadcast Film Critics Association Award) is an awards show presented annually by the Broadcast Film Critics Association (BFCA) to honor the finest in cinematic achievement. Written ballots are submitted during a week-long nominating period, and the resulting nominees are announced in December.

Drama League Awards
The Drama League Awards, created in 1935, honor distinguished productions and performances both on Broadway and Off-Broadway, in addition to recognizing exemplary career achievements in theatre, musical theatre, and directing.

Golden Globe Awards
The Golden Globe Awards are accolades bestowed by the 93 members of the Hollywood Foreign Press Association, recognizing excellence in film and television, both domestic and foreign.

MTV Movie & TV Awards
The MTV Movie & TV Awards (formerly MTV Movie Awards) is a film and television awards show presented annually on MTV. The nominees are decided by producers and executives at MTV.

National Board of Review
The National Board of Review of Motion Pictures is an organization in the United States dedicated to discussing and selecting what its members regard as the best film works of each year.

Palm Springs International Film Festival
Founded in 1989 in Palm Springs, California, the Palm Springs International Film Festival is held annually in January.

Satellite Awards
The Satellite Awards are annual awards given by the International Press Academy that are commonly noted in entertainment industry journals and blogs.

Screen Actors Guild Awards
The Screen Actors Guild Award (also known as the SAG Award) is an accolade given by the Screen Actors Guild‐American Federation of Television and Radio Artists (SAG-AFTRA) to recognize outstanding performances in film and primetime television. Hudson has won once from three nominations.

Music

Black Reel Awards
The Black Reel Awards, or "BRAs", is an annual American awards ceremony hosted by the Foundation for the Augmentation of African-Americans in Film (FAAAF) to recognize excellence in African-American, as well as those of African diaspora's cinematic achievements in the around the world film industry as assessed by the Academy's voting membership.

Billboard Music Awards 

The Billboard Music Award is an honor given by Billboard, a publication and music popularity chart covering the music business.

Golden Globe Awards
The Golden Globe Awards are accolades bestowed by the 93 members of the Hollywood Foreign Press Association, recognizing excellence in film and television, both domestic and foreign.

Grammy Awards
The Grammy Awards (originally called Gramophone Award), or Grammy, is an honor awarded by The Recording Academy to recognize outstanding achievement in the mainly English-language music industry. The annual presentation ceremony features performances by prominent artists, and the presentation of those awards that have a more popular interest. It shares recognition of the music industry as that of the other performance awards such as the Emmy Awards (television), the Tony Awards (stage performance), and the Academy Awards (motion pictures). Hudson has won two awards from eight nominations.

Hollywood Music in Media Awards
The Hollywood Music in Media Awards is an award organization honoring original music (Song and Score) in all forms visual media including film, TV, video games, trailers, commercial advertisements, documentaries, music videos and special programs.

iHeartRadio Music Awards
The iHeartRadio Music Awards is a music awards show founded by iHeartRadio in 2014 to recognize the most popular artists and music over the past year as determined by the network's listeners.

MTV Movie & TV Awards
The MTV Movie & TV Awards (formerly MTV Movie Awards) is a film and television awards show presented annually on MTV. The nominees are decided by producers and executives at MTV.

MTV Video Music Awards
An MTV Video Music Award (commonly abbreviated as a VMA) is an award presented by the cable channel MTV to honor the best in the music video medium.

Satellite Awards
The Satellite Awards are annual awards given by the International Press Academy that are commonly noted in entertainment industry journals and blogs.

Society of Composers & Lyricists Awards

Both

BET Awards
The BET Awards were established in 2001 by the Black Entertainment Television network to celebrate African Americans and other minorities in music, acting, sports, and other fields of entertainment over the past year.

GLAAD Media Award
The GLAAD Media Award is an accolade bestowed by GLAAD to recognize and honor various branches of the media for their outstanding representations of the lesbian, gay, bisexual and transgender (LGBT) community and the issues that affect their lives. Hudson has been nominated for one award.

People’s Choice Awards
The People's Choice Awards is an American awards show, recognizing the people and the work of popular culture, voted on by the general public. Hudson has won one award out of seven nominations.

NAACP Image Awards
The NAACP Image Awards is an award presented annually by the American National Association for the Advancement of Colored People to honor outstanding people of color in film, television, music and literature. Hudson has won eight awards out of twenty-one nominations.

Soul Train Awards
The Soul Train Music Awards is an annual awards ceremony that was established in 1987 to honor the best in African American music and entertainment. Hudson has received five nominations.

Kids' Choice Awards
The Kids' Choice Awards is an annual awards show that airs on the Nickelodeon television network. The awards honor the year's biggest achievements in music, film, sports, television, fashion, and more, voted by kids.

Teen Choice Awards
The Teen Choice Awards is an annual awards show that airs on the Fox television network. The awards honor the year's biggest achievements in music, film, sports, television, fashion, and more, voted by viewers aged 13 to 20.

Critics associations and other awards

Producing

Daytime Emmy Awards
The Daytime Emmy Awards, is an American accolade bestowed by the New York City–based National Academy of Television Arts and Sciences in recognition of excellence in American daytime television programming. The first ceremony was held in 1974, expanding what was originally a primetime-themed Emmy Award. Ceremonies generally are held in May or June.

Drama League Awards

Tony Award

Notes

References

Lists of awards received by American musician
Lists of awards received by American actor